The 1971–72 Gonzaga Bulldogs men's basketball team represented Gonzaga University during the 1971–72 NCAA University Division basketball season. Members of the Big Sky Conference, the Bulldogs were led by Hank Anderson  in his twenty-first season as their head coach. They played their home games on campus at Kennedy Pavilion in Spokane, Washington.

Junior forward Joe Clayton was selected to the all-conference team and junior center Greg Sten was second team. Senior guard Chris Nickola and sophomore guard Skip Molitor were honorable mention.

After over two decades at Gonzaga, Anderson left in late March to become the head coach at conference rival

References

External links
Sports Reference – Gonzaga Bulldogs: 1971–72 basketball season

Gonzaga Bulldogs men's basketball seasons
Gonzaga